Gabilan Acres (Gabilán, Spanish for "Sparrow hawk") is an unincorporated community in Monterey County, California.

References

Unincorporated communities in Monterey County, California
Gabilan Range
Unincorporated communities in California